The Los Angeles Junction Railway  is a wholly owned subsidiary of the BNSF Railway and provides rail switching service on 64 miles of track in Los Angeles County, California.

Its tracks are in the small industrial city of Vernon and adjacent industrial areas, southeast of Downtown Los Angeles.

History
The LAJ was planned in the early 1920s as the switching railroad for the Central Manufacturing District in the cities of Vernon, Maywood, Bell and Commerce.

Today, the LAJ Railway is a neutral switching railroad and receives interchange from two Class I Railroads, the BNSF Railway and the Union Pacific Railroad.

References

California railroads
BNSF Railway
Atchison, Topeka and Santa Fe Railway
Transportation in Los Angeles County, California
Bell, California
Maywood, California
Vernon, California
Companies based in Los Angeles County, California
Railway companies established in 1923
1923 establishments in California
Atchison, Topeka and Santa Fe Railway lines 
BNSF Railway lines